La Cuesta District is one of ten districts of the province Otuzco in Peru.

References